Pannell may refer to:

Charles A. Pannell Jr. (born 1946), United States federal judge
Charles Pannell (1902–1980), British Labour Party politician
Glen Pannell (born 1965), impersonator of Mike Pence, the 48th Vice President of the United States
Joseph Pannell Taylor (1796–1864), Union general in the American Civil War
Nita Pannell (1904–1994), Australian teacher, actress and theatre director
Norman Pannell, FCIS (1901–1976), British finance manager and Conservative politician
Phillip Pannell shooting incident, African American teenager killed by a police officer in New Jersey in 1990
Troy Pannell (born 1976), Australian rules football field umpire in the Australian Football League